Poland is not known or believed to possess weapons of mass destruction.  During the Cold War, Soviet nuclear warheads were stockpiled in Poland and designated to deploy within the Polish People's Army. Poland was also working with Russia to help eliminate the large stockpiles of chemical and biological weapons developed by the Warsaw Pact countries. Poland ratified the Geneva Protocol on 4 February 1929.

Chemical weapons
Poland ratified the Chemical Weapons Convention in August 1995 and did not declare any offensive program or chemical weapons stockpiles. In 2004 during the G8 Summit, the Polish-Russian agreement in the sphere of chemical weapons destruction was reached. The chemical weapons agreement will assist Russia in disposing of its lewisite stockpiles.

Biological weapons
Poland ratified the Biological Weapons Convention (BWC) on 25 January 1973 and is not known to have conducted any activity prohibited by the BWC.

Nuclear weapons

Soviet nuclear warheads in Poland

Poland has possessed Soviet nuclear weapons. Formerly, Poland was part of the Warsaw Pact. This meant that the Polish People's Army was equipped with aircraft (such as MiG-21, Su-7 and Su-22), as well as short range ballistic missiles (such as R-300 Elbrus, 9K52 Luna-M and OTR-21 Tochka) that could be used to deliver Soviet nuclear weapons. These could and probably would be provided in time of war. Prior to the end of the Cold War, the Soviet Union maintained large numbers of troops on Polish territory. These troops were equipped with nuclear weapons. In 1991, Poland announced that they would remove the nuclear capable delivery systems from their weapons inventory. They decided to keep about 40 of the OTR-21 Tochka systems armed with conventional warheads for self-defense. These launchers have now been completely retired.

From the early 1960s, nuclear weapons were stored on Soviet Armed Forces bases for their own use, in response to United States positioning nuclear weapons in Western Europe from the mid-1950s. In 1967 the Vistula Programme was agreed to build storage facilities so Soviet nuclear weapons could be made available to Polish forces in the event of war, mirroring the NATO nuclear sharing concept. Three storage site were completed late 1969, in forests near the villages of Brzeźnica-Kolonia, Podborsko and Templewo in western Poland. On 28 February 1970 an agreement was signed on the use of the sites, however the procedure for transferring nuclear warheads to Polish forces was never defined in detail, enabling the Soviet Union to interpret the agreement as it wished and they may have intended to never actually transfer any. In 1990 the agreement ceased to be in force following a year's notice period in the agreement, and the nuclear weapons were probably then removed from Poland.

Polish thermonuclear weapons program
Apart from Soviet warheads designated to deploy within Polish military in case of war with NATO, it is believed that Polish authorities attempted to develop thermonuclear weapons on its own. In 1970s a group of scientists headed by Sylwester Kaliski worked on initiating nuclear fusion using high-energy lasers. The project received considerable funds as well as personal support of first secretary of the ruling Polish United Workers' Party Edward Gierek, acknowledged with the potential military purpose of such idea. The research was dropped after Kaliski was killed in car crash in 1978, of which the circumstances remain unclear.

2022 Russian invasion of Ukraine
In the aftermath of the Russian invasion of Ukraine in 2022, several Polish politicians proposed that Poland host nuclear weapons under the NATO nuclear sharing program. President Andrzej Duda has said the idea is under discussion. Jarosław Kaczyński, the leader of Poland's governing party has stated he would like Poland to acquire nuclear weapons itself, but acknowledged it was "unrealistic".

References

Bibliography 

Foreign relations of Poland
Weapons of Poland
Politics of Poland
Weapons of mass destruction by country